This article lists fellows of the Royal Society elected in 1839.

Sir Thomas Dyke Acland, 10th Baronet
George Barker
Beriah Botfield
Robert Carrington, 2nd Baron Carrington
Arthur Conolly
Charles Darwin
Edward Davies Davenport
Henry Mangles Denham
Richard Drew
Henry Drummond
Arthur Farre
Thomas William Fletcher
William James Frodsham
Thomas Gaskin
George Godwin
John Thomas Graves
Edwin Guest
George Gulliver
James Halliwell-Phillipps
Christopher Hansteen
Peter Hardy
James Heywood
John Hilton
John Hogg
Gilbert Wakefield Mackmurdo
Samuel Roffey Maitland
Macedonio Melloni
Henry Moseley
H Alexander Ormsby
Adolphe Quetelet
William Reid
Robert Rigg
John Rogers
George Leith Roupell
Félix Savart
William Sharpey
Clement Tudway Swanston
James Joseph Sylvester
Charles Thorp
Charles Turnor
John Wesley Williams
James Yates

References

1839
1839 in the United Kingdom
1839 in science